Oedipus (Edward Hyson) is an American radio personality.  Oedipus's radio career began in 1975 as a D.J. at the Massachusetts Institute of Technology’s college station WTBS (today WMBR).  He gained notoriety as the pink-haired DJ who created the first Punk rock radio show in America, introducing Punk and New Wave to Boston and to the country. He did the first radio interviews with the Ramones, Talking Heads and The Damned (band), and legendary on-air conversations with The Clash, Public Image Ltd, Suicide (band) and so many others.

In 1977, Oedipus convinced WBCN to hire him as an announcer to bring his cutting edge sounds to the airwaves.  In 1981 he was named Program Director, a position he held until he left in 2004.  Under his tutelage, the station was recognized as an industry leader in breaking new music and received countless awards for its successes.  Multiple Billboard, FMQB, and Gavin Report award recipient for best Program Director of the Year, Oedipus hosted the acclaimed “Nocturnal Emissions” program for over 25 years, playing new tracks every Sunday night. In May 2001 Boston Magazine named Oedipus the third most influential person in the arts in Boston. When The Police were inducted into the Rock and Roll Hall of Fame in 2003, they thanked him personally for their initial support in America.

From 1995-2004 he served as Executive Producer of the live Radio broadcast for the New England Patriots.

Oedipus has his own foundation, The Oedipus Foundation, and is a member of the Board of Directors for The Technology Broadcasting Corporation of MIT, Stop Handgun Violence, and an original member of the Board of Directors for Mobius (an artist-run center for experimental work in all media). He is on the Board of Advisors for Community Servings, an organization that feeds Boston-area families with acute life-threatening illnesses, and a former member of the Board of Overseers for the Huntington Theatre Company, advisory member of The Center for Arts at the Armory in Somerville and the Boston Music Awards.

Oedipus also hosts an annual Christmas Eve show featuring rarely heard Christmas songs. It began at WBCN in the late '70s, moved to WFNX (2009–2012), then onto RadioBDC, The Boston Globe's internet radio station (2013-2014) before moving to WGBH in 2015. In 2018, the Mayor of Boston, Marty Walsh, issued a proclamation declaring December 24, 2018, as “Christmas Eve with Oedipus Day” in the City of Boston in recognition of his annual Christmas Eve broadcast for over 30 years spreading peace, love and understanding throughout Boston and the world.

On Saturday, October 5, 2013 RadioBDC (now Indie617) posted on their Facebook page that Oedipus would be hosting "The Oedipus Project" on Saturday mornings from 10AM local to noon featuring all new alternative/indie sounds.

In 2016 Oedipus was inducted into the Massachusetts Broadcasters Hall of Fame (Massachusetts Broadcasters Association). He can be found in the Rock and Roll Hall of Fame in Cleveland, Ohio, in the exhibit Dedicated to the One I Love: Rock and Radio.

Oedipus hosts a website called "The Oedipus Project." The site features new music nearly every day, as well as information and insight on the music industry. It can be found at Oedipus1

References 

Milano, Brett (2007), The Sound of Our Town (a History of Boston Rock & Roll), “Oedipus, College Radio, and WBCN:  We Want the Airwaves”

External links 

American radio DJs
Year of birth missing (living people)
Living people